William Garrett may refer to:

William Garrett, co-writer of "Please Mr. Postman"
William Garrett (Alabama politician) (1809–?), Secretary of State of Alabama, 1840–1852
William Garrett (Medal of Honor) (1842–1916), American Civil War soldier
Sir William Garrett (businessman) (1902–1977), British industrial chemist and businessperson
William A. Garrett (1854–1951), American lawyer and politician in the Virginia Senate
William B. Garrett III (born 1953), U.S. Army general
William Garrett (cricketer) (1876–1953), English cricketer
Bill Garrett (basketball) (1929–1974), first African American basketball player in the Big Ten athletic conference
Billy Garrett Jr. (born 1994) American basketball player and grandson of Bill Garrett
Bill Garrett (golfer) (1940–2010), American professional golfer
Ted Garrett (William Edward Garrett, 1920–1993), British Labour Party politician
Billy Garrett (1933–1999), American racecar driver
William Garrett Lewis (1821–1885), British Baptist preacher
W. G. Snuffy Walden (William Garrett Walden, born 1950), musician
Sir William Garrett (died 1571), Lord Mayor of London, 1555-1556